The fourth series of the British children's television series The Dumping Ground began broadcasting on 29 January 2016 on CBBC and ended on 2 December 2016. The series follows the lives of the children living in the fictional children's care home of Ashdene Ridge, nicknamed by them "The Dumping Ground". It consists of twenty, thirty-minute episodes, airing in two halves in January and October 2016. It is the twelfth series in The Story of Tracy Beaker franchise.

Cast

Main

Guest

Casting
In March 2015, an open casting call was announced for the character of Chloe. The requirements were for the actress to be a genuine wheelchair user aged between 10 and 14 years old, who could pass for 11 to 13 years old. Hannah Moncur was cast in the role.

Episodes

Production
Production began on 24 May 2015, and was completed on 12 November 2015.

Notes

References

2016 British television seasons
The Dumping Ground